The 1987 San Marino motorcycle Grand Prix was the twelfth race of the 1987 Grand Prix motorcycle racing season. It took place on 30 August 1987 at the Circuito Internazionale Santa Monica.

Classification

500 cc

References

San Marino and Rimini Riviera motorcycle Grand Prix
San Marino
San Marino Motorcycle Grand Prix
San Marino Motorcycle Grand Prix